Southland Entertainment Group is an Alabama based company that owned Alabama Splash Adventure (formerly known as VisionLand) in Bessemer, Alabama under the name Alabama Adventure Theme Park from January 2, 2003, until May 15, 2008. The company purchased the park for a bid of $5.25 million, which was below the asking price of $25 million. In 2008, Southland Entertainment sold Alabama Adventure Theme Park to Adrenaline Family Entertainment. Southland Entertainment Group is owned by Team Pro Parks and South Brook Entertainment.

References

Entertainment companies of the United States